Carol A. Donovan (born June 5, 1937, in Lynn, Massachusetts) is an American politician who was a member of the Massachusetts House of Representatives from 1991 to 2005.

See also
 1991–1992 Massachusetts legislature
 1993–1994 Massachusetts legislature
 1995–1996 Massachusetts legislature
 1997–1998 Massachusetts legislature
 1999–2000 Massachusetts legislature
 2001–2002 Massachusetts legislature
 2003–2004 Massachusetts legislature

References

External links
 

1937 births
People from Woburn, Massachusetts
Regis College alumni
Northeastern University alumni
Living people
Democratic Party members of the Massachusetts House of Representatives
Women state legislators in Massachusetts
21st-century American women